Vəlixanlı or Velikhanly may refer to:
 Vəlixanlı, Yardymli, Azerbaijan
 Vəlixanlı, Zardab, Azerbaijan